Qadir Nayel is a Pakistani politician who is member of the Provincial Assembly of Balochistan.

Political career
Nayel, a journalist by profession, contested by-election on 31 December 2018 from constituency PB-26 (Quetta-III) of Provincial Assembly of Balochistan on the ticket of Hazara Democratic Party. He won the election by the majority of 1,015 votes over the runner up Maulana Wali Muhammad Turabi of Muttahida Majlis-e-Amal. He garnered 5,272 votes while Turabi received 4,257 votes.

References

Living people
Hazara Democratic Party politicians
Politicians from Balochistan, Pakistan
Pakistani journalists
Year of birth missing (living people)